Stuart Jamieson (born October 22, 1951 in Saint John, New Brunswick) was a politician in the Province of New Brunswick, Canada. A self-employed carpenter, he was elected to the Legislative Assembly of New Brunswick in 1987 and re-elected in 1991, 1995 and re-elected again in 2003 and 2006 after having been defeated in 1999.

He represented the electoral district of Saint John-Fundy and was a member of the cabinet from 1998 to 1999 and from 2006 to 2010. He was removed from cabinet on February 5, 2010 for suggesting that the NB Power deal be put to a referendum.

References

1951 births
Canadian Baptists
Living people
Members of the Executive Council of New Brunswick
New Brunswick Liberal Association MLAs
Politicians from Saint John, New Brunswick
21st-century Canadian politicians